Darrell Lockhart (born September 14, 1960 in Thomaston, Georgia) is a retired American professional basketball center.

College career
Lockhart attended Auburn University, where he played college basketball with the Auburn Tigers.

Professional career
Lockhart was drafted by the San Antonio Spurs, in the second round (35 overall), of the 1983 NBA Draft. Lockhart spent one season in the National Basketball Association (NBA), as a member of the Spurs, during the 1983–84 season. He spent most of his professional career playing in Spain. Lockhart is the NBA’s all time leader in career field-goal percentage, shooting 100% on two attempts.

Career teams
High School. R. E. Lee Institute (Thomaston, Georgia).
1979–1983 Auburn Tigers
1983–1984 San Antonio Spurs. 2 games
1983–1984 Bancoroma Roma.
1984–1985  Maccabi Brussels.
1985–1986 Pepper Mestre.
1986–1988 Cajabilbao
1988–1989  Teorema Arese
1989–1994 CB Sevilla. 
1994–1995 CB Girona. 
1995–1996 Xacobeo 99 Ourense.
1996–1997 BC Andorra.
1997–1998 Los Barrios.

External links

1960 births
Living people
American expatriate basketball people in Italy
American expatriate basketball people in Spain
American men's basketball players
Auburn Tigers men's basketball players
Basketball players from Georgia (U.S. state)
BC Andorra players
Expatriate basketball people in Andorra
American expatriate basketball people in Andorra
CB Girona players
Centers (basketball)
Club Ourense Baloncesto players
Liga ACB players
Pallacanestro Virtus Roma players
People from Thomaston, Georgia
Real Betis Baloncesto players
San Antonio Spurs draft picks
San Antonio Spurs players